Jørgen Træen also known by his stage name Sir Dupermann (born 15 April 1973) is a Norwegian record producer, musician (guitar, keyboards and bass guitar) and electronica artist from Bergen. He is best known for his work as a music producer and for the studio 'Duper Studio', which he runs together with Yngve Sætre.

Career 
Several Norwegian artists have recorded their albums at the 'Duper Studio'. Among the artists he has cooperated with as a producer is Kaizers Orchestra, The National Bank (on both albums), Sondre Lerche (on the first three albums), Jaga Jazzist ( A Livingroom Hush), Poor Rich Ones (Naivety's Star) and Helén Eriksen (City Dust).

As a musician he is in and has been in bands and projects like noise band 'Golden Serenades', the pop band 'House of Hiss', Toy, 'Slut Machine' and 'Der Brief'. In 2002 he released electronica album Sir Dupermann under the artist name 'Sir Dupermann'.

Discography 

Within "Slut Machine"
1996: Slut Machine (SlutMachine)

With Lars-Erik Ter Jung
1999: 8.-10. December 1998 (Albedo)

Within "Spunk"
2001: Filtered Through Friends (Rune Grammofon)

Within "Sir Dupermann"
2002: Sir Dupermann (Smalltown Supersound)

With Jaga Jazzist
2002: A Livingroom Hush

With Magnet
2003: On Your Side (Ultimate Dilemma)
2004: Lay Lady Lay (Ultimate Dilemma), feat. Gemma Hayes

With Lars Horntveth
2004: Pooka (Smalltown Supersound)
2004: The Joker Maxi Single (Smalltown Supersound)

With Sondre Lerche
2004: Two Way Monologue (EMI Music Norway)

With Ralph Myerz & The Jack Herren Band
2004: Your New Best Friends (Emperor Norton)

Within Toy duo with Alisdair Stirling
2006: Toy (Smalltown Supersound)
2007: Half Baked Alaska (Smalltown Supersound)

Within "Golden Serenades"
2007: Golden Serenades / Sewer Election (Roggbif Records)
2009: Hammond Pops (+3DB Records)

With Nils Martin Larsen
2011: Endless Repeats (Spoon Train Audio)
With Susanne Sundfør
 2012: 'The Silicone Veil
 2017: Music For People In Trouble

References

External links 
Jørgen Træen Credits on AllMusic

Norwegian record producers
Norwegian guitarists
Male bass guitarists
Norwegian male bass guitarists
Norwegian keyboardists
Musicians from Bergen
1973 births
Living people
21st-century Norwegian bass guitarists
21st-century Norwegian male musicians